The Aquarium Museum of Nancy (French: Muséum-aquarium de Nancy, MAN), is a heritage establishment of scientific and technical culture jointly managed by the Métropole du Grand Nancy and the University of Lorraine.

This natural history museum includes zoological and paleontological collections as well as living collections, mainly ichthyological.

References

Natural history museums in France
Aquaria in France
Buildings and structures in Nancy, France
Museums established in 1933
Art Deco architecture in France
University museums in France
Buildings and structures completed in 1933
University of Lorraine
20th-century architecture in France